Josef Božek (Polish: Józef Bożek) (28 February 1782 in Biery – 21 October 1835 in Prague) was an engineer and inventor from Cieszyn Silesia, labelled by various sources as Czech or Polish. The area was part of the Austrian Empire during much of his life. He is considered one of founders of Czech mechanics. He put into operation one of the first steam engines in the Czech lands. His sons, František and Romuald, also became accomplished engineers.

External links
 

Steam engine engineers
Engineers for the Austrian Empire
Inventors from the Austrian Empire
Czech engineers
Polish engineers
Czech inventors
Polish inventors
Czech mechanical engineers
Polish mechanical engineers
1782 births
1835 deaths
People from Cieszyn Silesia
People from Cieszyn County